Teplodar is a city and municipality in Odesa Oblast, Ukraine. It is located in Odesa Raion. Population:  In 2001, population was 8,830.

History
The city of Teplodar was founded on 15 May 1981. The intent of the city was to provide housing for the workers of an atomic thermal power station very close to the city which would provide power for Odesa. The development of the city was halted in 1986 after the Chernobyl disaster. In 1997 the construction of the station was completely canceled.

See also 
 Odesa Nuclear Power Plant

References 

Cities in Odesa Oblast
Populated places established in the Ukrainian Soviet Socialist Republic
Cities of regional significance in Ukraine
Company towns in Ukraine
1981 establishments in Ukraine
Populated places established in 1981
Hromadas of Odesa Oblast
Cities in Odesa Raion